Marvin Martinez is a Salvadoran-American academic administrator. He is chancellor of Rancho Santiago Community College District. Martinez was president of Los Angeles Harbor College and East Los Angeles College.

Early life and education 
Martinez was born in El Salvador. He immigrated to Brooklyn and later moved to Long Beach, California. Martinez graduated from Woodrow Wilson Classical High School. He earned a bachelor of arts in English from University of California, Los Angeles (UCLA). He completed a master of arts in urban planning from UCLA.

Career 
Martinez was the dean of business and industry at Cerritos College. He was the vice president of planning and development of the Santa Monica Community College District and the provost of Santa Monica College. Martinez was the president of Los Angeles Harbor College from 2010 to 2013. He oversaw a $444 million in bond construction project and balanced the college budget in his first year. Martinez became the president of East Los Angeles College July 2013, replacing interim president Farley Herzek. On July 1, 2019, Martinez became the Chancellor of the Rancho Santiago Community College District.

Personal life 
Martinez has four children.

References 

Living people
Year of birth missing (living people)
Salvadoran emigrants to the United States
People from Long Beach, California
University of California, Los Angeles alumni
Cerritos College
Los Angeles Harbor College
Santa Monica College faculty
Heads of universities and colleges in the United States